The lead-cooled fast reactor is a nuclear reactor design that features a fast neutron spectrum and molten lead or lead-bismuth eutectic coolant. 
Molten lead or lead-bismuth eutectic can be used as the primary coolant because especially lead, and to a lesser degree bismuth have low neutron absorption and relatively low melting points. 
Neutrons are slowed less by interaction with these heavy nuclei (thus not being neutron moderators) and therefore, help make this type of reactor a fast-neutron reactor. In simple terms, if a neutron hits a particle with a similar mass (such as hydrogen in a Pressurized Water Reactor PWR), it tends to lose kinetic energy. In contrast, if it hits a much heavier atom such as lead, the neutron will "bounce off" without losing this energy.
The coolant does, however, serve as a neutron reflector, returning some escaping neutrons to the core.
Fuel designs being explored for this reactor scheme include fertile uranium as a metal, metal oxide or metal nitride.
Smaller capacity lead-cooled fast reactors (such as SSTAR) can be cooled by natural convection, while larger designs (such as ELSY) use forced circulation in normal power operation, but will employ natural circulation emergency cooling. No operator interference is required, nor pumping of any kind to cool the residual heat of the reactor after shutdown.
The reactor outlet coolant temperature is typically in the range of 500 to 600 °C, possibly ranging over 800 °C with advanced materials for later designs. 
Temperatures higher than 800 °C are theoretically high enough to support thermochemical production of hydrogen through the sulfur-iodine cycle, although this has not been demonstrated.

The concept is generally very similar to sodium-cooled fast reactor, and most liquid-metal fast reactors have used sodium instead of lead. 
Few lead-cooled reactors have been constructed, except for some Soviet nuclear submarine reactors in the 1970s, but a number of proposed and one in construction new nuclear reactor designs are lead-cooled.

The lead-cooled reactor design has been proposed as a generation IV reactor.
Plans for future implementation of this type of reactor include modular arrangements rated at 300 to 400 MWe, and a large monolithic plant rated at 1,200 MWe.

Modular nuclear reactors 
Reactors that use lead or lead-bismuth eutectic can be designed in a large range of power ratings. The Soviet union successfully operated the Alfa class submarines with a lead-bismuth cooled fast reactor in the sixties and seventies, which had approximately 30 MW of mechanical output for 155 MW thermal power (see below).

Other options include units featuring long-life, pre-manufactured cores, that do not require refueling for many years.

The lead-cooled fast reactor battery is a small turnkey-type power plant using cassette cores running on a closed fuel cycle with 15 to 20 years' refuelling interval, or entirely replaceable reactor modules. It is designed for generation of electricity on small grids (and other resources, including hydrogen and potable water).

Advantages of lead in fast reactors 

The use of lead as a coolant has several advantages if compared to other methods for reactor cooling.
 Molten lead does not significantly moderate neutrons. Moderation occurs when neutrons are slowed down by repeated collisions with a medium. When the neutron collides with atoms that are much heavier than itself, almost no energy is lost in the process. Thus, the neutrons are not slowed down by lead, which ensures that the neutrons keep their high energy. This is similar to other fast reactor concepts, including the molten liquid sodium designs.
 Molten lead acts as a reflector for neutrons. Neutrons escaping the core of the reactor are to some extent directed back into the core, which allows a better neutron economy. This in turn enables more spacing between the fuel elements in the reactor, allowing better heat removal by the lead coolant.
 Lead undergoes almost no activation by neutrons. Thus, virtually no radioactive elements are created by absorption of neutrons by the lead. This is in contrast to the lead-bismuth eutectic which was used in other fast designs, including in Russian submarines. The bismuth in this mixture (which has a lower melting point, 123.5 °C, than that of pure lead) is activated to some degree to 210Po, Polonium-210, which is an alpha emitter.
 Although virtually no neutrons are absorbed by the lead, lead is very effective at absorbing gamma rays and other ionizing radiation. This ensures that radiation fields outside the reactor are extremely low.
 In contrast to molten sodium metal, another relatively popular coolant that is used in fast reactors, lead does not have issues with flammability (although the combustion of sodium in air is a mild reaction, not to be confused with the violent reaction between sodium and water), and will solidify from a leak. 
 The very wide temperature range at which lead remains liquid (more than 1400 K or °C) implies that any thermal excursions are absorbed without any pressure increase. In practice, the operational temperature will be kept at around -, mainly because of other material properties.
 As with all fast reactor designs, because of the high temperature and the high thermal inertia, passive cooling is possible in emergency situations. Thus, no electrical pumping is required, natural air convection is sufficient to remove residual heat after shutdown. To achieve this, reactor designs include dedicated passive heat removal systems, that requires no electrical power and no operator action.
 All fast reactor designs operate at substantial higher temperatures in the core than water cooled (and moderated) reactors. This allows a significantly higher thermodynamic efficiency in the steam generators. Thus, a larger portion of the nuclear energy is converted into electricity. More than 40% efficiency is achievable in real life, compared to around 30% in water cooled reactors.
 Similarly, as with all fast spectrum reactors, the coolant is not pressurized. This means that no pressure vessel is required, and the piping and ducts can be constructed with non-pressure resistant steel and alloys. Any leak in the primary coolant circuit will not be ejected at very high pressures.
 Lead has a high thermal conductivity (35 W/m.K) compared to that of water (0.58), which means that heat transport from the fuel elements to the coolant is effective.
Instead of refueling, the whole core can be replaced after many years of operation. Such a reactor is suitable for countries that do not plan to build their own nuclear infrastructure.
 Lead's nuclear properties allow it to prevent a positive void coefficient, which is difficult to prevent in large sodium fast reactor cores. 
 Lead does not react significantly with water or air, unlike sodium which burns readily in air and can explode in contact with water. This allows easier, cheaper and safer containment and heat exchanger/steam generator design.

Disadvantages 

 Lead and lead-bismuth are very dense, increasing the weight of the system therefore requiring more structural support and possibly seismic protection which increases building cost, although a more compact structure may be beneficial as well. 
 While lead is cheap and abundant, bismuth is expensive and quite rare. A grid connected lead-bismuth reactor requires hundreds of tonnes of lead-bismuth depending on reactor size. 
 Solidification of lead-bismuth solution renders the reactor inoperable. Lead has a higher melting point of 327.5 °С, but is often used as a pool type reactor where the large bulk of lead does not easily freeze.
 By leaking and solidifying, the coolant may damage equipment (see Soviet submarine K-64), if measures to contain such leaks are not taken.  
 Lead-bismuth produces a considerable amount of polonium from neutron activation of bismuth. This radioactive element will dissolve in the lead-bismuth, and is an alpha emitter with a half-life of 138 days. This can complicate maintenance and pose a plant contamination problem. The alpha particle emitted has a high energy, and is therefore hazardous. 
Pure lead produces orders of magnitudes less polonium, and so has an advantage over lead-bismuth in this regard.
 The most challenging problem of lead is the potential for erosion and corrosion of the reactor internals. New specialized materials such as alumina forming austenitic steels, which maintain a protective oxide layer on the reactor components, are candidates under investigation.

Implementation

Russia/USSR
Two types of lead-cooled fast reactor were used in Soviet Alfa class submarines of the 1970s. The OK-550 and BM-40A designs were both capable of producing 155MWt. They were significantly lighter than typical water-cooled reactors and had an advantage of being capable to quickly switch between maximum power and minimum noise operation modes.

A joint venture called AKME Engineering was announced in 2010 to develop a commercial lead-bismuth reactor. The SVBR-100 ('Svintsovo-Vismutovyi Bystryi Reaktor' - lead-bismuth fast reactor) is based on the Alfa designs and will produce 100MWe electricity from gross thermal power of 280MWt, about twice that of the submarine reactors. They can also be used in groups of up to 16 if more power is required. Uranium oxide enriched to 16.5% U-235 could be used as fuel, and refuelling would be required every 7–8 years. A prototype is planned for 2017.

Another two lead cooled reactors are developed by Russians: BREST-300 and BREST-1200. The BREST-300 design was completed in September 2014.

WNA mentions Russia role on boosting other countries interest in this field:

Proposals and in-development

Belgium
The MYRRHA project (for Multi-purpose hYbrid Research Reactor for High-tech Applications) is a first-of-a-kind design of a nuclear reactor coupled to a proton accelerator (so-called Accelerator-driven system (ADS)). This will be a 'Lead-bismuth-cooled fast reactor' with two possible configurations: sub-critical or critical.
The project is managed by SCK•CEN, the Belgian center for nuclear energy. It will be built based on a first successful demonstrator: GUINEVERE. The project entered a new phase of development in 2013 when a contract for the front-end engineering design was awarded to a consortium led by Areva.
MYRRHA enjoys international recognition and was listed in December 2010 by the European Commission as one of 50 projects for maintaining European leadership in high-tech research in the next 20 years.

Germany
The dual fluid reactor (DFR) is a German project combining the advantages of the molten salt reactor with the ones of the liquid metal cooled reactor. As a breeder reactor the DFR can burn both natural uranium and thorium, as well as recycle nuclear waste. Due to the high thermal conductivity of the molten metal, the DFR is an inherently safe reactor (the decay heat can be removed passively).

Romania
ALFRED (Advanced Lead Fast Reactor European Demonstrator) is a lead cooled fast reactor demonstrator designed by Ansaldo Energia from Italy planned to be built in Mioveni, Romania. ATHENA, a molten lead pool used for research purposes, is going to be built in the same site as well.

Russia
Insofar as serious development is involved, Russia seems to be on the forefront of developing the lead cooled fast reactor. The BREST reactor is currently under construction. This reactor will employ pure lead as coolant, a plutonium/uranium nitride fuel, generate 300 MWe (electric) from 750 MWth, and is a pool type reactor.
The foundation has been completed in November 2021. The reactor sits as the Siberian Chemical Combine's (SCC's) Seversk site.

Sweden 
The company LeadCold is in collaboration with KTH Royal Institute of Technology and Uniper developing the SEALER (Swedish Advanced Lead Reactor) reactor, a lead-cooled reactor using uranium nitride as fuel.

United States
The initial design of the Hyperion Power Module was to be of this type, using uranium nitride fuel encased in HT-9 tubes, using a quartz reflector, and lead-bismuth eutectic as coolant. The firm went out of business in 2018.

The Lawrence Livermore National Laboratory developed SSTAR was a lead-cooled design.

See also 

Fast breeder reactor
Fast neutron reactor
Gas-cooled fast reactor
Generation IV reactor
Integral fast reactor
Sodium-cooled fast reactor

References 

 Advanced reactor, fuel cycle, and energy products workshop for universities
 Generation IV International Forum lead-cooled fast reactor website

External links 
 Idaho National Laboratory Lead-Cooled Fast Reactor (lead-cooled fast reactor) Fact Sheet
 Heavy-Metal Aerosol Transport in a Lead-Bismuth Cooled Fast Reactor with In-Vessel Direct-Contact Steam Generation
 Comparison of sodium and lead-cooled fast reactors regarding reactor physics aspects, severe safety and economical issues
RBEC-M Lead-Bismuth Cooled Fast Reactor Benchmarking Calculations
New York Times
 
 

Liquid metal fast reactors
Lead